The 1994 version of the Legion of Super-Heroes (also called the Post-Zero Hour or Reboot Legion) is a fictional superhero team in the 31st century of the DC Universe. The team is the second incarnation of the Legion of Super-Heroes, following after the 1958 version, and was followed by the 2004 rebooted version. It first appeared in Legion of Super-Heroes (vol. 4) #0 (October 1994) and was created by Mark Waid, Tom McCraw and Stuart Immonen.

Publication history
Following Zero Hour, a new Legion continuity was created, beginning with a retelling of the origin story starting in Legion of Super-Heroes (vol. 4) #0 and then continued in spin-off sister series Legionnaires #0 (both released in October 1994). Lightning Lad was renamed Live Wire, and after the group's founding, a large number of heroes were added to the roster very quickly. Several members from the previous continuity were given new codenames, and some new heroes were added, including XS (the granddaughter of Barry Allen, the second Flash), Kinetix, and Gates.

While in some ways following the pattern of the original continuity, the new continuity diverged from the old one in several ways: some characters died as they had previously, others did not, and some Legion members spent time in the 20th century where they recruited Ferro. The Legion also started out having to earn the respect of the United Planets, which they did through two well-earned victories: successfully defending Earth from the White Triangle Daxamites, a group of Nazi-style racial purists; and exposing United Planets President Chu as the mastermind behind the Braal-Titan War, the Sun Eater hoax, the formation of the Fatal Five and the brainwashing of future Legionnaire Jan Arrah.

New writers Dan Abnett and Andy Lanning came on board with penciller Olivier Coipel to produce a dark story leading to the near-collapse of the United Planets and the Legion. In the wake of the disaster, a group of Legionnaires disappeared through a spatial rift and the two existing Legion series came to an end. The limited series Legion Lost (2000–2001) chronicled the difficult journey of these Legionnaires to return home, while the ensuing limited series Legion Worlds (2001) showed what was happening back in the United Planets during their absence.

A new series, The Legion, was launched in which the Legion was reunited and given a new base and purpose. Written for its first 33 issues by Dan Abnett and Andy Lanning, the series was cancelled with issue #38. The most notable addition to the team during the title's publication was the Post-Crisis Superboy, a 21st-century clone of Superman and Lex Luthor who had previously been granted honorary membership.

Final Crisis: Legion of 3 Worlds

The Post-Zero Hour Legion reappeared in the 2008-2009 Final Crisis: Legion of 3 Worlds limited series, written by Geoff Johns and drawn by George Pérez. The miniseries features the 1994 Legion teaming up with Superman and the Post-Infinite Crisis and 2004 incarnations of the Legion to fight a new incarnation of the Legion of Super-Villains (led by Superboy-Prime) and the Time Trapper.

It is revealed at the end of the miniseries that Earth-247 and its entire universe were destroyed during the events of Infinite Crisis. The Post-Zero Hour Legion, under the guidance of Shikari Lonestar, takes the name "the Wanderers" and decides to travel the Multiverse to look for survivors from the various alternate universes that were destroyed.

Members

Workforce

The Workforce is a fictional  semi-heroic-super-team, in DC Comics' Post-Zero Hour Legion of Super-Heroes continuity. The group was introduced in Legion of Super-Heroes #64 (January 1995).

Fictional history
The Workforce was founded by the corrupt industrialist Leland McCauley as a response to the Legion of Super-Heroes, founded by his rival R.J. Brande. When Live Wire was replaced in the Legion by his sister Spark, he joined the Workforce with the belief that McCauley could help him find his brother Mekt. While the team often appeared to be performing heroic deeds, everything they did was designed for McCauley's profit. Karate Kid commented that the only reasons for being in the Workforce were selfish ones.

The team had little teamwork skills, often getting in each other's way in battle. McCauley would often shout orders at them through holographic projection, thereby telegraphing their moves to their opponents. Live Wire eventually quit and rejoined the Legion, inspiring other members to do the same, which forced McCauley to hire new members frequently.

A later version of the group consisted entirely of adults, to make the point that the Legion was endangering teenagers. However, a member of this group was actually the eight-year-old Lori Morning, using her H-Dial to appear adult.

The group disbanded during the "One Year Gap" and was replaced by the "Oversight Watch."

Membership

Original members
Spider Girl (fired to create "Adult Workforce")
Evolvo (fired to create "Adult Workforce")
Ultra Boy (quit, joined Legion)
Karate Kid (quit, joined Legion)
Inferno (transported to 20th century Earth)

Later members
Blast-Off ("killed", see Wildfire)
Particon (contract bought out by R.J. Brande)
Radion (contract bought out by R.J. Brande)

Adult Workforce
 Repulse
 Amber
 Dune
 Lori Morning

Appearances in other media
In the Legion of Super-Heroes animated series, the "Light Speed Vanguard", although mostly based on the Legion of Super-Villains, has some similarity with the Workforce, most notably by being a team of apparent heroes who work for profit, and by having Lightning Lad temporarily join before realizing the truth.

See also
Legion of Super-Heroes
Legion of Super-Heroes (1958 team)
Legion of Super-Heroes (2004 team)
List of Legion of Super-Heroes members
List of Legion of Super-Heroes publications

References

External links
Legion of Super-Heroes (Post-Zero Hour) at the DC Database Project
The Legion of Super-Heroes Reference File
.

DC Comics superhero teams
DC Comics titles

Characters created by Mark Waid
Reboot comics